The Perusine War (also Perusian or Perusinian War, or the War of Perusia) was a civil war of the Roman Republic, which lasted from 41 to 40 BC. It was fought by Lucius Antonius and Fulvia, wife of Mark Antony, and the Umbrians of Perusia to support Mark Antony against his political enemy Octavian (the future Emperor Augustus).

Fulvia felt strongly that her husband should be the sole ruler of Rome instead of sharing power with the Second Triumvirate, especially Octavian. Her prominence in the ensuing conflict was unusual for Roman society, where women were excluded from power and their political contributions rarely documented.

Fulvia and Antony's younger brother, Lucius Antonius, raised eight legions in Italy. The army held Rome for a brief time, but was then forced to retreat to the city of Perusia (modern Perugia, Italy). The Umbrians were sympathetic since some of their towns and surrounding land had been confiscated by Octavian for colonisation by his veterans after the defeat of Brutus and Cassius at Philippi in 42 BC.

During the winter of 41–40 BC, Octavian's army laid siege to the city, finally causing it to surrender due to starvation when the besieged realized reinforcements from Italy or the East were not coming. The lives of Fulvia and Lucius Antonius were spared, and Antonius was sent to govern a Spanish province as a gesture to his brother. Antony exiled Fulvia to Sicyon, where she died of an unknown illness in 40 BC. She was declared posthumously to have been the sole cause of dispute between Antony and Octavian, whose repaired alliance was symbolized by Antony's new marriage to Octavian's sister Octavia. This arrangement collapsed eight years later, and Antony and Octavian resumed their civil war.

References 

40s BC conflicts
1st century BC in the Roman Republic
Roman Republican civil wars
41 BC
40 BC
Perugia